Pomors or Pomory (seasiders) are an ethnographic group descended from Russian settlers, primarily from Veliky Novgorod, living on the White Sea coasts and the territory whose southern border lies on a watershed which separates the White Sea river basin from the basins of rivers that flow south.

History
As early as the 12th century, explorers from Novgorod entered the White Sea through the Northern Dvina, Mezen, Pechora and Onega estuaries and founded settlements along the sea coasts of Bjarmaland. Kholmogory served as their chief town until the rise of Arkhangelsk in the late 16th century. From their base at Kola, they explored the Barents Region and the Kola peninsula and Novaya Zemlya.

Later the Pomor discovered and maintained the Northern Sea Route between Arkhangelsk and Siberia. With their ships (koches), the Pomors penetrated to the trans-Ural areas of Northern Siberia, where they founded the settlement of Mangazeya east of the Yamal Peninsula in the early 16th century. Tatyana Bratkova has reported that some historians speculate that in the early 17th century, Pomors settled the isolated village of Russkoye Ustye in the delta of the Indigirka, in north-eastern Yakutia.

The name of the Pomors derives from the Pomorsky (literally, "maritime") coast of the White Sea (between Onega and Kem), having the root of more (meaning "sea"; derived from an Indo-European root). The same root appears in the toponym Pomerania (Polish: Pomorze) and Armorica and also in the Gaulish ethnonym Morini.

The term Pomor, which in the 10th–12th centuries meant "a person who lived near sea", gradually was extended into one to apply to this population living relatively far away from the sea. Finally in the 15th century, the people became disconnected from the sea. The sea was not a major part of economy of this region. At the same time, people began using the term Pomor'e to refer to a territory of practically the whole European Russian North, including the Murmansk, Arkhangelsk and Vologda regions; and Karelia and Komi republics.

The traditional livelihoods of the Pomor based on the sea included animal hunting, whaling and fishing; in tundra regions they practiced reindeer herding. The Pomor traded by sea in corn and fish with Northern Norway, which became important to both sides. This trade was so intensive that a kind of Russian-Norwegian pidgin language Moja på tvoja (or Russenorsk) developed on the North Norwegian coast that was used from 1750 to 1920.

In the 12–15th centuries, Pomor'e was considered an extensive colony of the state of Veliky Novgorod. By the early 16th century the annexation of Pomor'e by Moscow was completed. In the 17th century, in 22 Pomor'e districts the great bulk of the population consisted of free peasants. A portion of the land belonged to monasteries and to the Stroganov merchants. There were no landlords in Pomor'e. The population of Pomor'e districts was engaged in fishing, mica and salt production (Sol'-Kamskay, Sol'- Vychegodskay, Tot'ma, etc.) and other enterprises. 

The Russian Brockhaus and Efron Encyclopedic Dictionary, in its 1890–1907 edition, classified Pomors as Great Russians or referred to them as Russian traders and trappers of the North. To date, no encyclopedia or encyclopedic dictionary refers to the Pomor as a separate ethnic group.

In the 2002 census, respondents had the option to identify as "Pomors", this group being tabulated by the census as a subgroup of the Russian ethnicity. However, only 6,571 persons did so, almost all of them in Arkhangelsk Oblast (6,295) and Murmansk Oblast (127).

Like most other Russians, Pomors have traditionally been Orthodox Christians in faith. Prior to the Revolution of 1917 a large percentage of Russians from Pomorje (or Pomors) were practicing Old Believers.

Notable Pomors

 Mikhail Lomonosov (1711–1765), polymath, born near Kholmogory
 Fedot Shubin (1740–1805), sculptor, born near Kholmogory

Present day use of the name
One of the three universities of Arkhangelsk was named the Pomor State University (now merged into Northern (Arctic) Federal University).
In line with the current Russian trend towards amalgamating the least populated federal subjects into larger entities, a merger of Arkhangelsk and Murmansk Oblasts, the Komi Republic, and the Nenets Autonomous Okrug has been proposed, one of the possible names of this new territory being the Pomor Krai.

See also

Russian North
Pomor dialects
Boris Shergin
Laughter and Grief by the White Sea, a film celebrating the Pomors' culture.
Pomor trade
Barentsburg Pomor Museum

References

External links
 Pomors, definition, Efremova Academic Dictionary, Russian
 Pomors, definition, Большой Энциклопедический Словарь, Great Encyclopedic Dictionary, Russian
 Pomors, definition, Ushakov's Encyclopedic Dictionary, Russian
 Brockhaus & Efron, Encyclopedia, 1890–1907, Russian
 Pomor State University at Archangel / Arkhangelsk, Russian
 Tatiana Shrader  Across the Borders: the Pomor Trade, English
  Pomormuseet i Vardø -Pomor Museum in Vardø, Norwegian and Russian
 Pomorje and Pomors, different types within Russian nation, the origins, in Russian

 
Russian sub-ethnic groups
Social groups of Russia
White Sea
East Slavs
Ethnic groups in Russia
Slavic ethnic groups